The following list is a discography of production by Mac Miller, who was an American rapper and record producer from Pittsburgh, Pennsylvania. Miller often produced under the pseudonym Larry Fisherman.

2011

Chevy Woods – Red Cup Music
02. "Fucked Up"

Mac Miller – I Love Life, Thank You 
 10. "Boom Bap Rap" (featuring The Come Up)

Mac Miller – Blue Slide Park 
 10. "Up All Night"

2012

Mac Miller 
 "Day One: A Song About Nothing"
 "PlaneCarBoat" (featuring Schoolboy Q) 
 "No Photos (Posse Cut Pt. 1)" (featuring Most Dope)
 "These Dayz (Dope Awprah)"
 "He Who Ate All the Caviar"
 "Doodling in the Key of C Sharp"

Larry Lovestein & The Velvet Revival – You 
01. "Life Can Wait"
02. "Love Affair"
03. "Suspicions"
04. "A Moment 4 Jazz"
05. "You"

2013

Choo Jackson – Beer Flavoured Pizza
16. "Soul Food"

Mac Miller 
 "Confessions of a Cash Register" (featuring Prodigy)

Larry Fisherman – Run-On Sentences, Vol. 1 
01. "Birthday"
02. "If Poseidon Had a Surfboard"
03. "Novice Space Travel"
04. "Gelato Party"
05. "I Am Actually a Fish Alien"
06. "She Used To Love Me"
07. "The Revolution is Coming"
08. "Avocado"

TreeJay and DJ Clockwork – S.H.O.W. Time 
01. "Rainclouds" (featuring Larry Lovestein & The Velvet Revival)
03. "Money Team" (featuring Ab-Soul, Smoke DZA, and Dash)
09. "MellowHigh" (featuring Hodgy Beats and Domo Genesis)
11. "Boat Races" (featuring Boldy James and Freddie Gibbs)
18. "End of the World" (featuring Most Dope)

Ab-Soul 
 "The End is Near" (featuring Mac Miller)

Njomza – Gold Lion
06. "Kangaroo"
10. "Tell Me a Lie"

Larry Fisherman 
 "MHB"

Sir Michael Rocks – While You Wait... 
07. "In a Minute" (featuring Ab-Soul and Dash)

Mac Miller – Watching Movies with the Sound Off 
02. "Avian"
11. "Watching Movies" 
12. "Suplexes Inside of Complexes and Duplexes"
13. "REMember"
15. "Aquarium"

Vince Staples and Larry Fisherman – Stolen Youth 
 01. "Intro"
 02. "Fantoms" (featuring Joey Fatts)
 03. "Heaven" (featuring Hardo and Mac Miller)
 04. "Guns & Roses"
 05. "Back Sellin' Crack" (featuring Schoolboy Q)
 06. "Stuck In My Ways"
 07. "Killin' Y'all" (featuring Ab-Soul)
 08. "Thought About You"
 09. "Sleep" (featuring Dash, Ab-Soul, and Mac Miller)
 10. "Outro"

Dash – V.I.C.E.S 
 10. "Aristocratic Anarchy" (featuring Vince Staples)

Choo Jackson 
 "Marbles"

Delusional Thomas – Delusional Thomas 
 01. "Larry"
 02. "Halo"
 03. "Vertigo"
 04. "Bill" (featuring Earl Sweatshirt and Bill) 
 05. "72"
 06. "The Jesuits" (featuring Dash)
 07. "Dr. Thomas"
 08. "Labido"
 09. "Melvin"
 10. "Grandpa Used to Carry a Flask" (featuring Mac Miller)

Fresh a.k.a. Short Dawg – Call Me Fresh 
 12. "Bubble Gum Blues" (featuring Ab-Soul)

Mac Miller – Live from Space 
 12. "Life"
 13. "Black Bush"

Lil B – 05 Fuck Em 
80. "Pixar"

2014

Mac Miller 
 "Erica's House" (featuring TreeJay) 
 "Tequila"
 "Amen" (featuring Dash, Ab-Soul, Vince Staples, and Retch)

SZA – Z 
01. "Ur"
04. "Warm Winds" (featuring Isaiah Rashad)

Bill – Vagrant 
05. "Raw Product"
06. "Camp Fire" (featuring Mac Miller and Ab-Soul)

Mac Miller – Faces 
 03. "Friends" (featuring Schoolboy Q)
 04. "Angel Dust" 
 05. "Malibu"
 06. "What Do You Do" (featuring Sir Michael Rocks)
 12. "Funeral"  
 13. "Diablo"  
 14. "Ave Maria"
 15. "55" 
 16. "San Francisco"
 17. "Colors and Shapes"  
 19. "Uber" (featuring Mike Jones)
 21. "Apparition" 
 22. "Thumbalina" 
 24. "Grand Finale"

Boaz
"Rapness Monster"

Dash – Double A-Side Vol. 3
01. "Oblivion"
02. "Sloth"

Ab-Soul – These Days... 
14. "Ride Slow" (featuring Danny Brown and Delusional Thomas)

Riff Raff – Neon Icon
09. "Aquaberry Dolphin" (featuring Mac Miller)

Sir Michael Rocks – Banco 
10. "Lost Boys" (featuring Mac Miller and Trinidad James)

Your Old Droog
"Sleepers"

DJ Clockwork 
 "Clocktwerk"

2015

Mike G – Award Tour II 
 02. "James Bond"

TreeJay – Baum Blvd 
 02. "Days" (featuring Mac Miller)

Retch 
 "Troubled Man's Lullaby"

Njomza and Mac Miller 
 "Creatures of the Night" (featuring Delusional Thomas)

Larry Fisherman – Run-On Sentences, Vol. 2 
01. "Fuckin Shit"
02. "jjjoh"
03. "Hulu"
04. "Yooo"
05. "Atom Bomb"
06. "Juil"
07. "HXH"
08. "Here is a Bear"
09. "FACEBUSH"
10. "Funk Me"
11. "Best for Last"
12. "Smile"

2016

Larry Fisherman 
 "5 Foot Assassin: Larry Fisherman Tribute"
 "¡Go Fish! Volume 1" (featuring Conway)
 "¡Go Fish! Volume 2" (featuring Your Old Droog)
 "¡Go Fish! Volume 3" (featuring Michael Christmas)

Smoke DZA – George Kush da Button: Don't Pass Trump the Blunt
 14. "Beloved"

Choo Jackson 
 "O'Shea"

Spillage Village
 "Laundry Day" (featuring EarthGang and J.I.D)

2017

DJ Clockwork
"Dance"

2018

Mac Miller 
 "Buttons" 
 "Inertia"

Mac Miller – Swimming 
 01. "Come Back to Earth" 
 10. "Dunno" 
 11. "Jet Fuel" 
 13. "So It Goes"

Bill Waves – For The Lost Children EP
06. "New Wings"

2020

Mac Miller – Circles 
 01. "Circles" 
 02. "Complicated" 
 04. "Good News" 
 06. "Everybody" 
 08. "Hand Me Downs" 
 09. "That's on Me" 
 10. "Hands" 
 11. "Surf" 
 12. "Once a Day" 
 13. "Right" 
 14. "Floating"

References

 
Discographies of American artists
Production discographies